The Federal Ministry of Family Affairs, Senior Citizens, Women and Youth, abbreviated BMFSFJ, is a cabinet-level ministry of the Federal Republic of Germany. It is headquartered in Berlin with a secondary seat in Bonn. The ministry was represented by Anne Spiegel, the first woman minister of the Greens, who announced her resignment from office on 11 April 2022. On 14 April 2022, the Greens announced Lisa Paus to be her successor in office. Both Spiegel and Paus have to be officially dismissed respectively appointed by the Federal President.

History 
The original organization was first founded in 1953 as the Federal Ministry for Family Affairs (Bundesministerium für Familienfragen). In 1957, this was changed to the Ministry for Family and Youth Affairs (Bundesministerium für Familien- und Jugendfragen) and in 1963 to the Federal Ministry for Family and Youth (Bundesministerium für Familie und Jugend. In 1969 after the incorporation of the Federal Ministry for Health (Bundesministerium für Gesundheit, created in 1961), it was changed to the Federal Ministry for Youth, Family and Health (Bundesministerium für Jugend, Familie und Gesundheit). In 1986, it was renamed to the Federal Ministry for Youth, Family, Women, and Health (Bundesministerium für Jugend, Familie, Frauen und Gesundheit). The area of health was removed in 1991 and transferred to the Federal Ministry for Health. The remaining Ministry was divided into the Federal Ministry for Women and Youth (Bundesministerium für Frauen und Jugend), and the Federal Ministry for Family and Senior Citizens (Bundesministerium für Familie und Senioren). In 1994, these divided areas were recombined into the Federal Ministry for Family Affairs, Senior Citizens, Women and Youth (Bundesministerium für Familie, Senioren, Frauen und Jugend).

The activities of the Ministry were highlighted in media coverage in 2007 when the contents of one of the leaflets it distributed was claimed to encourage sexual massage between parents and their children. The leaflets were removed from circulation when the matter became national news.

Federal Ministers

Political Party:

References

External links
 Official Website of the BMFSFJ (German)

Family Affairs, Senior Citizens, Women and Youth, Federal Ministry of
Ministries established in 1953
Children, young people and families ministries
Women's ministries
1953 establishments in West Germany
Youth in Germany
Women in Germany